Michael Dorf is an American entrepreneur. A native of Milwaukee, Wisconsin, he founded the Knitting Factory, a New York City music performance venue, and City Winery, a chain of restaurants that feature live music and wine. Dorf is also a philanthropist who hosts many charity events and donates the proceeds of his tribute concerts at Carnegie Hall to various charities.

Early life and education 
Dorf grew up in Milwaukee, Wisconsin and graduated from Washington University in St. Louis with a degree in business and psychology.

Career

Knitting Factory era 

In 1986, at the age of 23, Dorf started the Knitting Factory in the East Village. The Knitting Factory later became a widely known club for jazz and rock music.
A spin-off entertainment company, KnitMedia, eventually established Knitting Factory Records.

KnitMedia promoted a number of music festivals, including the What is Jazz Festival.

In 1996, Dorf founded the Digital Club Network with partner Andrew Rasiej. During this time they also started the Macintosh Music Festival which became one of the first live-streaming concert events. In 1998 they had 250,000 users watching the concert live. The business grew and was eventually acquired by eMusic Group. 2002 was a tough year for the Knitting Factory following the September 11 attacks, resulting in a significant reduction of staff. By 2003 Dorf had diluted himself out of a controlling position in the company.

Post Knitting Factory 
Dorf started Tribeca Hebrew as an after-school program for his two boys and several other friends. In 2004, he rented a small storefront in Tribeca and brought in other families to help fund the school, which quickly grew to 120 kids under his leadership as the chairman in the first two years. In 2009, the school merged with JCP.

City Winery 
In 2008, Dorf started City Winery. on June 4, 2017, MSNBC reported that the company generated over $1 million in profits.

Since City Winery's inception in 2008, Dorf has expanded the company to five cities which include New York, Chicago, Nashville, Atlanta, and Boston. While City Winery is a concert venue as well as a restaurant, it is also a fully functioning winery, with its New York City location producing around 9,000 cases of wine a year. City Winery has not been without its missteps, with a failure of its Napa Valley location, which Dorf attributed to Napa's lack of urban environment central to the City Winery theme. However, in 2018 he made a deal to purchase the Montgomery Worsted Mills building in Montgomery, New York, in a rural area of Orange County, and turn it into another location.

Besides City Winery, Dorf has also opened another restaurant in New York City called City Vineyard. While City Vineyard at Pier 26 has ties to City Winery, it's a stand-alone restaurant that does not make wine like its sibling restaurants. City Winery is similar to its predecessor, Riverwalk in Chicago, which is also tied to City Winery.

In September 2017 City Winery signed a 5-year lease extension on its original 155 Varick St.NYC location, a deal which included a $2m renovation of the upper floor into a new venue 'The Loft', which opened in May 2018.  In July 2018, just as renovations were finished, the landlord Trinity Church announced they had leased the entire block to the Walt Disney Company for redevelopment. and that City Winery was to be evicted via a "demolition clause" in the lease. In January 2019 Dorf sued Trinity Church for $2m to recover his investment. On July 28, 2019, the New York Daily News published a lengthy op-ed by Dorf casting the story as a cautionary tale, but also mentioning a forthcoming move to a "sparkling new 32,000-square-foot City Winery at Pier 57 at Hudson River Park early next year.". The Varick St location closed on July 31, 2019. A New York Post story detailed the difficulties of moving "14 huge aluminum tanks and 350 wooden barrels filled with anywhere from 210 to 2,000 gallons of wine".

Philanthropy 
Dorf is chairman of Labshul, a non profit organization which defines itself as "everybody friendly, God-optional, and an experimental community gathering" in NYC for primarily Jewish individuals and families. Dorf is also a board member of the American Symphony Orchestra. He is on the boards of The Jewish Week and Newport Festivals, the parent organization of both the Newport Jazz Festival and the Newport Folk Festival.

Michael Dorf Presents 
Dorf has produced a number of tribute concerts at Carnegie Hall, the Apollo Theater, Central Park summer stage, Lincoln Center, The Beacon Theatre. To date, he has honored:

 Bob Dylan
 Bruce Springsteen
 R.E.M.  
 The Who
 David Bowie
 Jimmy Webb
 David Byrne & Talking Heads 
 Paul Simon
 Prince
 The Rolling Stones
 Robert Johnson
 Neil Young
 Simon & Garfunkel
 I'm Not There
 Neil Sedaka
 Elton John & Bernie Taupin
 Joni Mitchell
 Van Morrison

Personal life 
Dorf has two siblings, Julie Dorf and Josh Dorf, and is the eldest of them. On October 6, 1991, Michael married Sarah Connors. The couple have three children, a set of twins Eli and Zach, and a younger daughter Sophia.

References

External links
 

Living people
Year of birth missing (living people)
Businesspeople from Milwaukee
20th-century American businesspeople
21st-century American businesspeople
Washington University in St. Louis alumni
American music industry executives